The Canary moray (Gymnothorax bacalladoi) is a moray eel of the family Muraenidae, found only around the Canary Islands in the eastern central Atlantic, at depths between 17 and 605 m.  Its length is up to 35 cm.

References

 

Canary moray
Vertebrates of the Canary Islands
Endemic fauna of the Canary Islands
Canary moray